Laguna's 4th congressional district is one of the seven congressional districts of the Philippines in the province of Laguna. It has been represented in the House of Representatives of the Philippines since 1987. The district consists of the capital municipality of Santa Cruz and the entire eastern Laguna municipalities of Cavinti, Famy, Kalayaan, Luisiana, Lumban, Mabitac, Magdalena, Majayjay, Paete, Pagsanjan, Pakil, Pangil, Pila, Santa Maria and Siniloan. It is currently represented in the 19th Congress by Jam Agarao. of the Lakas–CMD.

Representation history

Election results

2022 
Incumbent Benjamin Agarao Jr. was term-limited and running for Mayor of Santa Cruz his team nominate his daughter and Incumbent Board Member Ma. Jamina Katherine Agarao. Agarao main opponent is Atty. Antonio Carolino.

2019 
Incumbent Benjamin Agarao Jr. was running for his third and final-term his main opponent is Felicisimo Mateo San Luis but later withdraw and substitute Atty. Antonio Carolino.

2016 
Incumbent Benjamin Agarao Jr. was running for reelection his opponents is former Congressman Edgar San Luis and Fidel Santos.

2013 
Incumbent Edgar San Luis was not runnibg for reelection instead he running for Governor, he nominate Benjamin Agarao Jr. who later won. Agarao opponents is Mayor Antonio Carolino and Grandson of former Congressman Benedicto Palacol Jr.

2010 
Incumbent Edgar San Luis was running for reelection unopposed.

2007 
Incumbent Benjamin Agarao Jr. is running for reelection. Agarao later lost to opponent Edgar San Luis, and Eufranio Lagumbay who lost too.

2004 
Incumbent Rodolfo San Luis is not running for reelection he nominate Benjamin Agarao Jr.. Agarao main opponent is Vincent Soriano, Erwin Maceda and 2 other candidates.

2001 
Incumbent Rodolfo San Luis was running for relection unopposed.

1998

1995

1992

1987

See also
Legislative districts of Laguna

References

Congressional districts of the Philippines
Politics of Laguna (province)
1987 establishments in the Philippines
Congressional districts of Calabarzon
Constituencies established in 1987